Wilson Collison (November 5, 1893 – May 25, 1941) was a writer and playwright.

Early years
Wilson Collison was the son of John B. Collison, a clerk in the City Engineer's Office, and Mary E. Gardner. Wilson Collison abandoned plans to become a scientist when he found he preferred writing. Showing signs of early talent he was nine when a Columbus newspaper accepted one of his stories. His writing was largely self-developed, as he completed only one year of high school. He worked as a printer, a stenographer, an advertising writer, and as a clerk in the wholesale and retail drug business.

Actor
At 18 Collison became an actor with a repertory company that toured small towns in Michigan. He also was a vaudeville performer.

Playwright and novelist
Collison's fame as a playwright came in 1919, when Up in Mabel's Room became a Broadway hit. Collison was an $18-a-week clerk in a Columbus, Ohio drugstore when he turned out this first success, in collaboration with Otto Harbach, about the pursuit of an incriminating undergarment which a shy bridegroom in a single bold moment had presented to a young woman whom he had temporarily fancied. Collison also co-wrote two successful farces with Avery Hopwood: The Girl in the Limousine (1919), about a man who is robbed and left in a woman's bedroom, and Getting Gertie's Garter (1921), about a lawyer who doesn't understand the difference between a bracelet and a garter.

Collison's play Red Dust, which closed after eight performances in New York, became the 1932 Clark Gable film by the same name and the 1953 Clark Gable film Mogambo. The hit movie had been a flop on stage: "Red Dust, a turgid play," was "a repetitious melodrama ... Another of those plays of the tropics, or anyway the near tropics, where passions are primitive and men wear their shirts open in the front," wrote the New York Times. His 1932 novel "The Red-Haired Alibi" was turned into a feature-length film of the same name by Tower Productions. Directed by Christy Cabanne, it was the first feature-length film to include Shirley Temple in the credits.

The Maisie series of motion pictures, with the first in 1939, was from Collison's novel Dark Dame. MGM cast Ann Sothern as Maisie Ravier, a brash American working woman. Sothern played the same role in a half-hour weekly radio series.

One of his works was adapted as 1933 film Sing, Sinner Sing

Works

Plays
1919 Up in Mabel's Room
1919 The Girl in the Limousine
1920 The Girl with the Carmine Lips
1921 Getting Gertie's Garter
1921 A Bachelor's Night
1922 Desert Sands
1923 Debris
1928 Red Dust

Novels
1929 Murder in the Brownstone House
1930 Diary of Death
1931 Blonde Baby
1931 Expensive Women
1932 Farewell to Women also called Dishonable Darling
1932 Red-haired Alibi
1932 Shy Cinderella
1933 Millstones
1933 One night with Nancy
1933 Sexational Eve
1934 Congo Landing
1935 Save a Lady
1935 The Second Mrs. Lynton
1936 Glittering Isle

Filmography
 The Girl in the Limousine (1924, based on The Girl in the Limousine) 
 Up in Mabel's Room (1926, based on Up in Mabel's Room) 
 Getting Gertie's Garter (1927, based on Getting Gertie's Garter) 
 Divorce Made Easy (1929) 
 Expensive Women (1931, based on Expensive Women) 
 Three Wise Girls (1932, based on Blonde Baby) 
 The Crusader (1932) 
 The Red-Haired Alibi (1932, based on Red-haired Alibi) 
 Red Dust (1932, based on Red Dust) 
 Night of the Garter (UK, 1933, based on Getting Gertie's Garter) 
 Sing Sinner Sing (1933) 
 Smart Girl (1935) 
 Woman Wanted (1935) 
 There's Always a Woman (1938) 
 There's That Woman Again (1938) 
 The Mad Miss Manton (1938) 
 Maisie (1939) 
 Congo Maisie (1940)
 Gold Rush Maisie (1940)
 Maisie Was a Lady (1941)
 Ringside Maisie (1941)
 Maisie Gets Her Man (1942)
 Swing Shift Maisie (1943)
 Maisie Goes to Reno (1944)
 Up Goes Maisie (1946)
 Undercover Maisie (1947)
 Moon Over Burma (1940) 
 Up in Mabel's Room (1944, based on Up in Mabel's Room) 
 Getting Gertie's Garter (1945, based on Getting Gertie's Garter) 
 Mogambo (1953, based on Red Dust)

Death
Collison died at home of a heart attack. He had no funeral, at his request, and his remains were cremated.

His wife remarried in 1942. Her next husband, Edwin Atherton died two years later.

References

1893 births
1941 deaths
20th-century American novelists
20th-century American dramatists and playwrights
American male novelists
American male dramatists and playwrights
20th-century American male writers